Xiao Jin (born March 2, 1985) is a Chinese Grand Prix motorcycle racer.

Career statistics

By season

Races by year
(key)

External links
http://www.motogp.com/en/riders/Jin+Xiao

1985 births
Living people
Chinese motorcycle racers
250cc World Championship riders